Paul Stewart (February 27, 1892 – November 13, 1950) was an American lawyer, newspaperman, and politician who served two terms as a U.S. Representative from Oklahoma from 1943 to 1947.

Biography
Born in Clarksville, Arkansas, Stewart moved with his parents, Charles Jackson and Mary Ellen Overbey Stewart, to Poteau, Indian Territory, in 1894. They moved to Red River County, Choctaw Nation, Indian Territory (now a part of McCurtain County, Oklahoma) in 1897.

Career
At age ten, Stewart became a rural mail carrier, and at thirteen he entered the mercantile business at Spencerville, Indian Territory. He was educated at home before attending school at age fourteen, and he finished four years later. In 1910 he moved his business to Haworth, Oklahoma, where he continued its operation until 1919. On August 7, 1912, Stewart married Berta Keen, daughter of Young and Eva Byrum Keen. The couple had two daughters, Elma and Martha. After they divorced, he remarried on June 9, 1938, to Irene Almond Smith, and they had no children.

Admitted to the bar in 1915, Stewart commenced the practice of law as well as becoming Postmaster at Haworth from 1914 to 1922. He served in the Oklahoma State house of representatives from 1922 to 1926. He moved to Antlers, Oklahoma, in 1929, where he was editor, owner, and publisher of the Antlers (Oklahoma) American, a weekly newspaper, from 1929 to 1950. He served as member of the State senate 1926-1942, serving as Democratic floor leader in 1929 and 1930 and as president pro tempore in 1933 and 1934. He was Acting Governor in 1933 and engaged in cattle raising, farming, and the hotel business.

Elected as a Democrat to the Seventy-eighth and Seventy-ninth Congresses, Stewart served from January 3, 1943  to January 3, 1947. He was not a candidate for renomination in 1946 to the Eightieth Congress, and resumed newspaper publishing, ranching, and managing hotel business until his death.

Death
Stewart died in Antlers, Oklahoma, on November 13, 1950, from a stroke after being overcome by smoke while fighting a grass fire. He is interred at City Cemetery.

References

External links

 Paul Stewart Collection at the Carl Albert Center
 

1892 births
1950 deaths
Democratic Party members of the United States House of Representatives from Oklahoma
People from Clarksville, Arkansas
People from McCurtain County, Oklahoma
People from Antlers, Oklahoma
20th-century American politicians